Shae La Roche (born September 3, 1992) is a Canadian water polo player. She won the silver medal with the Women's National Team at the 2015 Pan American Games and the 2019 Pan American Games. She competed at the 2020 Summer Olympics.

College career
Fournier attended Indiana University playing on the water polo team from 2011 to 2018. In her senior year at Indiana University she became the school’s first water polo player to earn Academic All-American honours. She was also a second-team All-American and Collegiate Water Polo Association Player of the Year. She set a Hoosiers record with 302 career goals, making her one of only five players in NCAA history to score 300 or more goals.

International career

Fournier made her senior debut in 2014, competing in the FINA Water Polo World League. In 2017 she won the silver medal at the 2017 FINA Women's Water Polo World League held in Shanghai, China. In June 2021, La Roche was named to Canada's 2020 Summer Olympics team.

References

External links
 

1992 births
Living people
Canadian female water polo players
Medalists at the 2015 Pan American Games
Medalists at the 2019 Pan American Games
Pan American Games silver medalists for Canada
Pan American Games medalists in water polo
Sportspeople from Calgary
Sportspeople from Winnipeg
Water polo players at the 2015 Pan American Games
Water polo players at the 2019 Pan American Games
Water polo players at the 2020 Summer Olympics
Olympic water polo players of Canada
Indiana Hoosiers women's water polo players